The Kaiwara River is a river of the northern South Island of New Zealand. The river flows initially east before turning southwest, twisting through a valley in the Lowry Peaks Range which lies between Cheviot and Culverden.

See also
List of rivers of New Zealand

References

Rivers of Canterbury, New Zealand
Rivers of New Zealand